Gorgos (1903 – 1920) was a British Thoroughbred racehorse and sire. He showed considerable promise as a two-year-old in 1905 when he won two of his four races including the July Stakes. In the following spring he recorded an upset victory in the 2000 Guineas but was beaten in all of his subsequent races. He was retired from racing at the end of the year and became a successful breeding stallion in France.

Background
Gorgos was a brown horse bred and owned by Arthur James. The colt was sent into training with Richard Marsh at his Egerton House stable in Newmarket, Suffolk.

Gorgos was one of the best horses sired by Ladas who won the 2000 Guineas and the Epsom Derby in 1894. His dam The Gorgon, was a high class racehorse who won the New Stakes for Arthur James in 1899 and later became a successful broodmare whose other descendants included Nebbiolo.

Racing career

1905: two-year-old season
Gorgos made little impact on his racecourse debut in June 1905 when he finished unplaced in the Triennial Stakes at Royal Ascot. In the following month, ridden by Herbert Jones he won July Stakes over five and a half furlongs at Newmarket Racecourse at odds of 7/4 from the favoured Alcanzor. A month later he led from start to finish to win the Prince of Wales's Stakes at Goodwood Racecourse. On his final start of the year he finished third in the Boscawen Stakes at Newmarket in autumn.

1906: three-year-old season
On 2 May Gorgos, with Herbert Jones in the saddle, started a 20/1 outsider in field of twelve for the 98th running of the 2000 Guineas over the Rowley Mile course for which the leading contenders appeared to be Gingal (runner-up in the Dewhurst Stakes) Bill of Play, Admiral Crichton, Beppo and Frustrator. The Coventry Stakes winner Black Arrow delayed the start with his "obstreperous" behaviour but then started quickly and led the field to halfway with Gorgos settled behind the leaders. Approaching the last quarter mile Ramrod and Admiable Crichton disputed the lead but the pair then swerved towards the centre of the track allowing Gorgos and the unnamed "Dame Agneta colt" (later named Sancy) to join the issue. In a closely contested finish Gorgos prevailed by a head from the Dame Agneta colt, with Ramrod a neck away in third.

Two weeks later the colt was moved up in distance for the Newmarket Stakes over ten furlongs and finished third behind Lally and Malua. In the Derby over one and a half miles at Epsom Racecourse on 30 May Gorgos started the 10/1 fifth favourite but was never in serious contention and finished seventh behind Spearmint. At Goodwood on 2 August Gorgos was stepped up in distance and matched against older horses to contest the Goodwood Cup over two and a half miles and finished third behind Plum Tree. On 12 September the colt ran in the St Leger over fourteen and a half furlongs at Doncaster Racecourse but after being left behind in a "shockingly bad" start he finished unplaced behind Troutbeck. Gorgos was "badly knocked about" in the race and never ran competitively again.

Assessment and honours
In their book, A Century of Champions, based on the Timeform rating system, John Randall and Tony Morris rated Gorgos a "poor" winner of the 2000 Guineas.

Stud record
In 1907, Gorgos was sold to the 11th Duc de Gramont and exported to become a breeding stallion in France. The best of his offspring included Sourbier (Prix du Jockey Club), Gorgorito (Prix Royal Oak), Bridaine (Prix du Cadran) and Listman (Poule d'Essai des Poulains). Gorgos died in France in July 1920.

Pedigree

References

1903 racehorse births
1920 racehorse deaths
Racehorses bred in the United Kingdom
Racehorses trained in the United Kingdom
Thoroughbred family 19-c
2000 Guineas winners